The Man Who Came Back may refer to

 The Man Who Came Back (play), 1916 Broadway play by Jules Eckert Goodman
 The Man Who Came Back (1924 film), American film directed by Emmett J. Flynn
 The Man Who Came Back (1931 film), American film
 "The Man Who Came Back" (UFO), UFO episode
 The Man Who Came Back (2008 film), American film